Bulbophyllum translucidum is a species of orchid in the genus Bulbophyllum  endemic to Samar, Leyte and Agusan, Philippines. It is named after the translucent nature of the tepals. It is placed in section Sestochilus.

References

 Kindler, M., Bustamante, R. & Ferreras, U.F. 2016. Die Orchidee (Hamburg) Die Orchidee 2(4) .pdf 
 Kindler, M., Bustamante, R. & Ferreras, U.F. 2016. Die Orchidee (Hamburg) 67(5): 402-406
 The Bulbophyllum-Checklist
 The Internet Orchid Species Photo Encyclopedia

External links 
 
 

translucidum
Endemic orchids of the Philippines
Flora of the Visayas
Flora of Mindanao
Taxa named by Rene Alfred Anton Bustamante
Taxa named by Ulysses Ferreras